Jed Cobb Adams (January 14, 1876 – January 29, 1935) was a member of the United States Board of Tax Appeals (later renamed the United States Tax Court) from 1933 to 1935.

Early life and education 
Adams was born in Kaufman, Texas. He "attended Southwestern University in Georgetown from 1889 to 1891 and Bingham School in Asheville, North Carolina, in 1892–93", gaining admission to the State Bar of Texas in 1895.

Career 
He then held various positions in  government, as a civilian and in the military:

He thereafter practice law in Dallas and became involved in party politics, becoming a Democratic National Committee member for Texas, from 1924 to 1934. On May 17, 1933, he was appointed to the Board of Tax Appeals by President Franklin D. Roosevelt to fill the unexpired term of William D. Love, who had died in April of that year. Adams held that office until his own death the following year.

References

Members of the United States Board of Tax Appeals
United States Article I federal judges appointed by Franklin D. Roosevelt
People from Kaufman, Texas
United States Attorneys for the Northern District of Texas
1876 births
1935 deaths